Without Pity is a 2014 Italian crime-thriller film co-written and directed by Michele Alhaique. It was screened in the Horizons section at the 71st Venice International Film Festival.

Plot    
Rome. Mimmo is the adopted son of the crime family led by Santili, the patriarch. Mimmo and his cousin Manuel, the legitimate son of the boss, act in a ruthless and arrogant way for the whole city, now terrified by their power. Despite everything, however, Mimmo, even if loyal to his family, would like to get out and live a quiet and peaceful life. He receives the task of bringing an escort, Tania, to his cousin's house in view of a party but, in love with her, he manages to take her away after hitting Manuel with a skateboard.

Cast 
Pierfrancesco Favino as Mimmo 
Greta Scarano as Tania 
Claudio Gioè as Roscio 
Adriano Giannini as Manuel 
 Iris Peynado as Pilar
Ninetto Davoli as Santili
 Renato Marchetti as Stefanino
 Samantha Fantauzzi as Deborah

See also   
 List of Italian films of 2014

References

External links

2014 films
Italian crime thriller films
2014 crime thriller films
2014 directorial debut films
2010s Italian films